The Cojedes River (Spanish Rio Cojedes) is a tributary of the Orinoco River in central Venezuela. The Cojedes originates in Lara state, and flows southeast through a gap between the Cordillera de Mérida and the Cordillera de la Costa and across the Llanos grasslands of the Orinoco Basin to empty into the Apure River, which flows east to join the Orinoco. The river drains portions of the states of Lara, Yaracuy, Portuguesa, Cojedes, Barinas, and Guárico.

This river maintains the main Orinoco crocodile (Crocodylus intermedius) population in Venezuela and therefore of the entire world. In the near future, sections of this river will be declared as wildlife reserve to protect the nesting sites of this species, classified as critically endangered.

As part of the Orinoco crocodile Conservation Program in Venezuela, between the years 2005 and 2007, have been reintroduced in the Cojedes river, 361 young crocodiles breed in captivity during at least one year, in order to increase their survival probabilities.

As in many other Venezuelan localities, the release of captive bred Orinoco crocodiles in the Cojedes river is intended to reinforce in the long term the reproductive populations of this species.

Rivers of Venezuela
Orinoco basin